Masuiyama Daishirō may refer to:

Masuiyama Daishirō I (1919–1985), sumo wrestler
Masuiyama Daishirō II (born 1948), also sumo wrestler and son of Masuiyama Daishirō I